Synthetic aperture sonar (SAS) is a form of sonar in which sophisticated post-processing of sonar data is used in ways closely analogous to synthetic aperture radar. Synthetic aperture sonars combine a number of acoustic pings to form an image with much higher along-track resolution than conventional sonars. The along-track resolution can approach half the length of one sonar element, though is downward limited by 1/4 wavelength. The principle of synthetic aperture sonar is to move the sonar while illuminating the same spot on the sea floor with several pings. When moving along a straight line, those pings that have the image position within the beamwidth constitute the synthetic array. By coherent reorganization of the data from all the pings, a synthetic aperture image is produced with improved along-track resolution. In contrast to conventional side-scan sonar, SAS processing provides range-independent along-track resolution. At maximum range the resolution can be magnitudes better than that of side-scan sonars.

A 2013 technology review  with examples and future trends is also available. For academics, the IEEE Journal of Oceanic Engineering article: Synthetic Aperture Sonar, A Review of Current Status gives an overview of the history and an extensive list of references for the community achievements up to 2009.

See also
 beamforming
 phased array
 side-scan sonar
 sonar
 underwater acoustics

References

External links
 KRAKEN MINSAS for AUV's
 KRAKEN INSAS for AUV's
 KRAKEN Actively Stabilized SAS Towfish - KATFISH
 iXBlue - SAMS-DT6000
 Kongsberg - Hisas
 Raytheon Applied Signal Technology - HD Sonar

Sonar
Synthetic aperture radar